François-Pierre Cherrier (September 3, 1717 – July 21, 1793) was a French-born merchant and notary in Lower Canada.

He was born in Savigné-l'Évêque in Sarthe, the son of François Cherrier and Périnne Isambart, and came to Saint-Antoine-de-Longueuil in New France, where his uncle was parish priest, in 1736. Cherrier opened a store there and became notary for the seigneury in 1738. He married Marie Dubuc in 1743. In 1750, Cherrier was named royal notary for the parish of Longueuil. After the conquest by the British, Cherrier's commission as a notary was renewed but his finances suffered as the result of the conversion of the currency. In 1765, he moved to Montreal in the hope of better prospects but returned to Longueuil two years later. In 1770, he moved to Saint-Denis where his son François was parish priest. Cherrier continued to practise as a notary there until 1789 and died in Saint-Denis at the age of 75.

His sons Benjamin-Hyacinthe-Martin and Séraphin and his grandson Côme-Séraphin served in the assembly. His daughter Périne-Charles married Denis Viger and was the mother of Denis-Benjamin Viger; his daughter Rosalie married Joseph Papineau and was the mother of Louis-Joseph Papineau.

References 

1717 births
1793 deaths
People from Sarthe
Pre-Confederation Canadian businesspeople
French emigrants to pre-Confederation Quebec
Immigrants to New France